Kinwarton Dovecote is circular 14th-century dovecote situated  on the edge of the village of Kinwarton, near Alcester, Warwickshire, England. The dovecote is in the ownership of the National Trust and is a scheduled monument.

The building still houses doves to this day and is noted for its "potence" (a pivoted ladder) which provides access to the nesting boxes.

References

External links
Kinwarton Dovecote information at the National Trust
Photos of Kinwarton Dovecote

National Trust properties in Warwickshire
Grade I listed buildings in Warwickshire
Scheduled monuments in Warwickshire
Dovecotes